Admiral William Alexander Baillie-Hamilton (6 June 1803 – 1 October 1881) was a Scottish naval commander who served on the Arctic Council when it was searching for Sir John Franklin.

Biography 
A member of the Baillie-Hamilton family headed by the Earl of Haddington, he was the son of the Venerable Charles Baillie, Archdeacon of Cleveland and his wife Lady Charlotte Home, daughter of Alexander Home, 9th Earl of Home. Three of his brothers also gained distinction. Sir George Baillie was Ambassador to Tuscany; Charles Baillie-Hamilton was a politician; Ker Baillie-Hamilton was Governor of the Leeward Islands; and Cospatrick Baillie-Hamilton was also an admiral in the Royal Navy.

Baillie-Hamilton served on the Arctic Council when it was searching for Sir John Franklin. He married Harriet Hamilton (1812–1884), daughter of James Hamilton, Viscount Hamilton, in 1836. They had two daughters and four sons. A gravestone with the names inscribed of William Alexander Baillie-Hamilton's and that of his wife, Harriet, lies in Greyfriars Churchyard, Edinburgh. He is listed as having died in Portree, on the Isle of Skye.

He became Second Secretary to the Admiralty on 28 April 1845.

His son, also William (1844–1920), played football for Scotland in the first of the England v Scotland representative football matches (1870–1872) and was later a senior civil servant. Another son, Charles (1848–1927), also played for Scotland in the same match.

References

External links 
 Full navy career

1803 births
1881 deaths
William Alexander
Permanent Secretaries to the Admiralty
Royal Navy admirals